This is a list of Australian Football League players who have multicultural ancestry (which includes players born overseas or who had one parent born overseas).

In 2020, about 15 per cent of AFL players were born overseas or had one parent born overseas. This was up from 13 per cent in 2019, according to AFL data. In 2015 season there were 121 multicultural players, more than half had one parent from Anglophone countries, mainly the United Kingdom, Ireland and New Zealand.

Current players born outside of Australia

Albania
Adem Yze

Austria

Alex Jesaulenko (Austrian-born, born in Salzburg)
Justin Leppitsch (Austrian-born father)

Barbados
 Josh Gibson (Bajan father)

Brazil
Heritier Lumumba (Born in Brazil; Congolese father, Brazilian mother)

Canada
Mike Pyke
Andrew McGrath

Chile
Jose Romero
Tim Kelly

China

Cook Islands
Karmichael Hunt

Croatia
Jason Akermanis (Croatian father)
Alan Didak (Parents born in Croatia)
Jon Dorotich
Gordon Fode
Ray Gabelich
Darren Gaspar
Ilija Grgic
Allen Jakovich
Glen Jakovich
Addam Maric (Croat father)
Ivan Maric (Parents born in Croatia)
Brody Mihocek (Father born in Croatia)
Mark Nicoski (Croat mother, Macedonian father)
Val Perovic
Steven Salopek (Parents born in Croatia)
Peter Sumich
Jacob Surjan

Cyprus
Andrew Demetriou

Czech Republic
Paul Vinar

Denmark
Tom Boyd (Danish mother)
Jim Marchbank (Danish father)

East Timor
Lin Jong (Taiwanese mother, Timorese-Chinese father)
Jarvis Pina

Egypt
Ahmed Saad (Egyptian parents)

Ethiopia
Changkuoth Jiath

Estonia
Dane Rampe (Estonian father)

Fiji
Alipate Carlile (Fijian mother)
Aaron Hall (Fijian mother)
Setanta Ó hAilpín (See below Ireland & Northern Ireland)
Aisake Ó hAilpín (See below  Ireland & Northern Ireland)
Nic Naitanui
Tom Nicholls (Fijian mother)
David Rodan (Fijian-born Tongan mother, Tongan father)
Esava Ratugolea (Fijian parents)
Atu Bosenavulagi (Born in Fiji)

France
Allan La Fontaine (Born in Australia; French)

Germany
Otto Buck
Herman Dohrmann
Jordan Doering
Harry Frei (Born in Germany)
Carl Keller
Harry Lampe (German father)
 Jack Riewoldt (German father)
Nick Riewoldt (German father)
Alex Ruscuklic
Paul Schmidt
David Schwarz (German father)
Charlie Schunke
Conrad ten Brink
Dean Terlich
Heinz Tonn (Born in Germany)

Ghana
Joel Amartey
Isaac Quaynor

Greece
Ang Christou 
Andrew Demetriou (See above Cyprus)
Josh Francou
Gary Frangalas
John Georgiades
John Georgiou
Con Gorozidis
Athas Hrysoulakis
Patrick Karnezis
Paul Koulouriotis
Spiro Kourkoumelis
Anthony Koutoufides (Greek father, Italian mother)
George Lakes (both parents born in Greece)
Angelo Lekkas
Stephen Malaxos
Spiro Malakellis
Tony Malakellis
Alex Marcou
Daniel Metropolis
Russell Morris
Albert Pannam
Alby Pannam
Charlie Pannam (footballer, born 1874)
Charlie Pannam (footballer, born 1897)
Matthew Panos (Greek father)
Chris Pavlou
Phil Poursanidis
Lou Richards
Ron Richards
John Rombotis
Jimmy Toumpas
Jason Traianidis
Zeno Tzatzaris
Vasil Varlamos
David Zaharakis (Greek father)
see: Greek Team of the Century

Hong Kong
Cameron Polson (Born in Hong Kong)

Hungary
Patrick Veszpremi (Hungarian father)

India
Blaine Boekhorst (Indian mother; Dutch father)
Daniel Kerr (Anglo-Indian father)
Jordan McMahon
Ben McNiece (Anglo-Indian mother)
Alex Morgan (Australian footballer) (Indian parent)
Clancee Pearce (Indian mother)
Fred Pringle (English parents)
Alex Rance (Indian mother)
Alex Silvagni (Anglo-Indian mother)

Ireland

Israel
Mordy Bromberg
Ezra Poyas
Ian Synman

Italy

Steven Alessio (father and mother Italian-born)
Ron Auchettl
Edo Benetti (Father and mother)
John Benetti (Father)
Peter Bevilaqua (Born in Italy)
Marcus Bontempelli
Bert Boromeo (Italian father)
Mario Bortolotto (Father and mother)

Vin Catoggio (Father and mother)
Reece Conca (Italian father)
Stephen Coniglio (English mother; Italian father)
Adam Contessa (father)
Frank Curcio
Steven Da Rui (Father and mother)
Ron De Iulio (Father and mother)
Danny Del-Re (Father and mother)
Brett Deledio
Frank Dimattina (Father and mother)

Robert DiPierdomenico
Alec Epis
Alex Fasolo
Brendan Fevola (Italian father)
Michael Firrito
Silvio Foschini (Father and mother)
Cyril Gambetta
Len Incigneri
Anthony Koutoufides (See above Greece)
Tony Liberatore
Paul Licuria (Italian father, Spanish mother)
Frank Marchesani
Al Martello

Ray Martini
Peter Matera
Phillip Matera
Wally Matera
Mark Mercuri
Joe Misiti
Anthony Morabito (Italian mother)
Romano Negri
Christian Petracca
Peter Pianto
Paul Puopolo (Italian parents)
Simon Prestigiacomo (Italian father)
Adam Ramanauskas
Peter Riccardi
Mark Ricciuto

Frank Rigaldi
Matt Riggio
Guy Rigoni
Anthony Rocca (Father born in Italy)
Saverio Rocca (Father born in Italy)
Renato Serafini
Alex Silvagni (Anglo-Indian mother, Italian father)
Sergio Silvagni (Father and mother Italian-born)
Stephen Silvagni (Mother and paternal grandparents Italian-born)
Ian Stewart
Shane Valenti
Bill Valli (Italian parents)
Herc Vollugi

Japan
Alex Davies (Japanese mother)
Mitchito Owens (Japanese mother)

Kenya
Aliir Aliir (See Sudan below)
Majak Daw

Latvia
Peter Agrums
Mark Blicavs
Arnold Briedis
Andrejs Everitt (Latvian mother)
Peter Everitt (Latvian mother)
Rene Kink
Arnold Briedis

Lebanon
Bachar Houli
Mil Hanna
Robin Nahas
Adam Saad
Christian Salem

Lithuania
Algy Vosilaitis (Born in Lithuania)
Adam Ramanauskas
Jack Lukosius

Malaysia
Robert Ahmat (Malay and Torres Strait Islander ancestry)
Paul Medhurst (English father, Malaysian mother)

Malta
Jayden Attard  
Tony Buhagiar
Jaryd Cachia
David Calthorpe
John Formosa (footballer)
Blake Grima
Nathan Grima
Adam Saliba

Myanmar
Andrew Embley (Anglo-Burmese father)
Trent Dennis-Lane (Anglo-Burmese father)

Netherlands
Robbert Klomp
Paul van der Haar
David Hale (Dutch mother)
Matthew Kreuzer
Daniel Pearce (Dutch mother, New Zealand father)
Ben Rutten (New Zealand mother, Dutch father)
Billie Smedts (English mother, Dutch father)
Andrew Swallow (Dutch mother, English father)
David Swallow (Dutch mother, English father)
Richard Vandenberg
Jay van Berlo
Nathan van Berlo
Nick Vlastuin

New Zealand

Oskar Baker
Simon Black
Paul Bower (Maori mother)
Greg Broughton (Maori father)
Louis Butler
Adam Campbell
Trent Croad
Danny Dickfos (Maori)
Donald Dickie (Maori)
Aaron Edwards (New Zealand father, Samoan mother)
Max Gawn
Heath Grundy
Kurt Heatherley
Karmichael Hunt
Jarrad Jansen (Born in New Zealand; parents born in New Zealand)
Dustin Martin (Maori father)
Beau Maister
Rowan Marshall (Born in New Zealand)
Daniel McAlister (Maori)
Sam Mitchell
Thomas O'Halloran (Born in New Zealand)
Brett Peake (Maori)
Brian Peake (Maori)
Daniel Pearce (Dutch mother, New Zealand father)
Jasper Pittard
Jordan Russell
Ben Rutten (New Zealand mother, Dutch father)
Shane Savage (Born in New Zealand; Maori father, European mother)
Wayne Schwass (Maori)
Joe Sellwood
Nathan van Berlo
Jay van Berlo
Brent Renouf
Rupert Wills (Born in New Zealand)
Marley Williams (Maori father)
Toby Wooller (Born in New Zealand)

Nigeria
Joel Wilkinson (Nigerian father)

North Macedonia
Josh Daicos (Father's parents)
Nick Daicos (Father's parents)
Peter Daicos (Parents born in Greek Macedonia)
John Gastev
Mark Nicoski (Mother born in Croatia; father born in North Macedonia)
Nick Malceski (Macedonian father)
Alex Marcou (Parents born in Greek Macedonia)
Paul Peos (Parents born in Greek Macedonia)
Sam Petrevski-Seton (Indigenous Australian/Macedonian)

Norway
Wally Koochew (Chinese father and Norwegian mother)

Papua New Guinea
Aiden Bonar (Papua New Guinean mother, Scottish father)
Cameron Ellis-Yolmen
James Gwilt (British Welsh father, Papua New Guinean mother)
Peter Ladhams
Mal Michael
Patrick Murtagh
Ben Sexton
Michael Sexton
Nick Vlastuin
Ollie Wines

Peru
Nick Shipley (Peruvian mother)

Philippines
Mathew Stokes (Aboriginal, Filipino-Spanish descent)
Alex Woodward (Filipino mother)

Poland
Jason Blake (Polish mother, English father)
John Pitura
James Podsiadly
Jared Polec

Russia
Bohdan Jaworskyj
Alex Jesaulenko (Born in Salzburg, Austria to a Ukrainian father, Russian mother)
Oleg Markov (born in Belarus, to Russian parents)

Samoa
Aaron Edwards (See above New Zealand)
Karmichael Hunt

Seychelles
Matt Thomas (Seychelles mother)

Serbia
Brian Kekovich
Sam Kekovich
Lazar Vidovic
Lukas Markovic

Slovenia
Nick Suban
Rene Kink
Dayne Zorko (father born in Yugoslavia, now Slovenia)

South Africa
Jack Baggott (Born in South Africa)
Damian Cupido
Jack Darling (Father born in South Africa)
Eugene Kruger (Born in South Africa)
Stephen Lawrence
Ryan Lester (Born in Australia; English-born mother and South African-born father)
Ian Muller
Jason Johannisen (Born in South Africa; Zambian mother, South African father)

South Korea
Peter F. Bell (Born in Korea; Mother born in South Korea, father born in America)

Spain
Paul Licuria (See above Italy)

Sri Lanka
Hayden Crozier (Sri Lankan father)
Craig Jacotine (Parents born in Sri Lanka)
David Gallagher
Enrico Misso (Burgher descent)

Sudan/South Sudan
Aliir Aliir (born in Kenya to Sudanese parents)
Tarir Bayok
Michael Frederick
Buku Khamis
Majak Daw
Gach Nyuon
Mabior Chol
Reuben William

Sweden
Kris Massie (Born in Sweden)

Switzerland
Henri Jeanneret
Matthew Leuenberger (Swiss father)

Taiwan
Lin Jong (Taiwanese mother, Timorese-Chinese father)

Thailand
Sudjai Cook

Tonga
Israel Folau
David Rodan (Fijian-Tongan mother, Tongan father)

Turkey
Taylin Duman (Turkish born father)
Sedat Sir
Errol Gulden

Tuvalu
Scott Harding

Uganda
Emmanuel Irra (Born in Uganda)

Ukraine
Jason Daniltchenko
Alex Ishchenko
Bohdan Jaworskyj
Alex Jesaulenko (Born in Salzburg, Austria to a Ukrainian father, Russian mother)
Jake Kolodjashnij (Ukrainian Russian father)
Kade Kolodjashnij (Ukrainian Russian father)
Steven Kolyniuk
Jared Petrenko
Jason Porplyzia
Justin Staritski
Shane Woewodin

United Kingdom
Roy Cazaly (Scottish mother, English father)
Martin Clarke
Pearce Hanley (Born in England, United Kingdom; Welsh mother, Irish father)
Jamie O'Reilly
Brodie Smith (English mother, Scottish father)
Aaron Young (English mother, Scottish father)

England
 Callum Brown (Born in England, United Kingdom)
Percy Bowyer (Born in England, United Kingdom)
Chris Burton (Born in England, United Kingdom)
Bill Eason (Born in England, United Kingdom)
Mitch Golby (Born in Australia; English father)
Ryan Harwood (Born in Australia; English mother)
Garrick Ibbotson (English mother)
 Connor Idun (Born in England, United Kingdom)
Brandon Jack (Born in England, United Kingdom)
Daniel Kerr (See above India)
Ryan Lester (Born in Australia; English-born mother and South African-born father)
Brad Moran (Born in England, United Kingdom)
Chris Mayne (English father)
Paul Medhurst (English father)
Brian Mynott (Born in England, United Kingdom)
Bill Perkins (Born in England, United Kingdom)
John Scarlett 
Matthew Scarlett (English father)
Billie Smedts (English mother, Dutch father)
David Swallow (Dutch mother, English father)
Clive Waterhouse (Born in England, United Kingdom)
Jack Watts (Parents born in England, United Kingdom)
 Josh Worrell (Born in England, United Kingdom)
John Worsfold

Northern Ireland
Conor Glass (Born in Northern Ireland, United Kingdom)
Stuart Magee (Born in Northern Ireland, United Kingdom)

Scotland
Thomas Leather (Born in Scotland, United Kingdom)
Bill Morris (Scottish father)
Charlie Norris (Scottish father)
James Aitken (Scottish father)
James Duncan Gordon (Scottish father)
Ewan Thompson (Born in Scotland, United Kingdom)
Sean Wight (Born in Scotland, United Kingdom)
Roy Cazaly (Scottish mother)
Alex Lang (Scottish father) 
Luke McGuane
Rhys Palmer (Scottish father)
Firth McCallum (Scottish father)
Paul Stewart (Scottish father) 
Sam Docherty (Scottish father) 
John Bell (Scottish parents)
Doug Fraser (Scottish parents)
Bill Proudfoot (Scottish parents)
Andy Dougall (Scottish parents)
Stan Reid (Scottish father)
Ted McLean (Scottish father)
Colin Campbell (Scottish father)
Les MacPherson (Scottish father)
Alick Ogilvie (Scottish father)
Grant Lawrie (Scottish parents)
Alexander John Fraser (Scottish parents)
Alex Barlow (Born in Scotland, United Kingdom)
Matthew Dick (Born in Scotland, United Kingdom)
Bob Edmond (Born in Scotland, United Kingdom)
Brian Cook (Born in Scotland, United Kingdom)
Henry McPetrie (Born in Scotland, United Kingdom)
William Marshall (Born in Scotland, United Kingdom)
Jim Edmond (Born in Scotland, United Kingdom)
Bruce Sloss (Scottish father)
Stanley McKenzie (Scottish mother)
Hugh Plowman (Scottish father) 
Ramsay Anderson (Born in Scotland, United Kingdom)
George Sutherland (Born in Scotland, United Kingdom)
Norman Doig (Scottish parents)
Bob Cameron (Scottish parents)
Stewart Geddes (Scottish parents)

Wales
James Gwilt (British Welsh father, Papua New Guinean mother)
Cian Hanley (Welsh mother, Irish father)
Pearce Hanley (Welsh mother, Irish father)
 John McCarthy

United States
Zac Clarke (Born in Australia; American father)
Mason Cox (Born in the United States)
Elliott Himmelberg
Harrison Himmelberg
Jason Holmes (Born in the United States)
Kyle Langford
Touk Miller (American father)
Conor Nash
Don Pyke (Born in the United States)
Archie Smith (footballer, born 1995) (Born in Australia; American-born mother)
Tim Taranto
Sanford Wheeler (Born in the United States)

Zimbabwe
 Tendai Mzungu (Zimbabwean father)
 Ian Perrie

See also
List of Australian Football League players born outside Australia

References

Lists of players of Australian rules football
Players of Australian rules football by nationality
VFL/AFL players